The Großer Burgberg is a ca.  high hill on the northern rim of the Harz mountains range, right on the edge of Bad Harzburg in Lower Saxony.

Geography
It is situated east of the valley of the Radau River, where it leaves the Harz range and flows through the northern foothills towards its confluence with the Oker. The southern outskirts of Bad Harzburg reach up to the foot of the forested slopes.

Both peaks offer sweeping views over the town and the Northern Lowland.

Since 1929 the Burgberg Cable Car runs up to the summit from the Radau River and the B 4 federal road.

External links 
 Website of Bad Harzburg

Hills of Lower Saxony
Hills of the Harz
Bad Harzburg